Lillian Roth (December 13, 1910 – May 12, 1980) was an American singer and actress.

Her life story was told in the 1955 film I'll Cry Tomorrow, in which she was portrayed by Susan Hayward, who was nominated for the Academy Award for Best Actress for her performance.

Early life
Roth was born on December 13, 1910, in Boston, Massachusetts, the daughter of Katie (née Silverman) and Arthur Rutstein. Her family was Jewish. She was only 6 years old when her mother took her to Educational Pictures, where she became the company's trademark, symbolized by a living statue holding a lamp of knowledge. In her autobiography, I'll Cry Tomorrow (1954), she describes being molested by the man who painted her as a statue. She attended the Professional Children's School in New York City with classmates Ruby Keeler and Milton Berle.

In 1917 Roth made her Broadway debut as the character "Flossie" in The Inner Man. Her film debut occurred the following year, when she performed as an extra in the government documentary Pershing's Crusaders. She and her sister Ann also toured together during this period as "Lillian Roth and Co.", although at times they were billed as "The Roth Kids". According to Lillian's autobiography, one of the highlights of their tour was meeting U.S. President Woodrow Wilson, who attended the girls' vaudeville act and afterwards allowed them to ride with him briefly in his chauffeur-driven car.

Roth entered the Clark School of Concentration in the early 1920s. She appeared in Artists and Models in 1923 and went on to make Revels with Frank Fay. During production for the show, she told management she was 19 years of age despite being only 13 at the time.

Career
In 1927, at the age of 17, Roth returned to Broadway to perform in the first of three Earl Carroll Vanities, which was followed by Midnight Frolics, a Florenz Ziegfeld production. Soon the young actress signed a seven-year contract with Paramount Pictures.

Among the films she made with Paramount are The Love Parade (1929) with Maurice Chevalier and Jeanette MacDonald, The Vagabond King (1930), Paramount on Parade (1930), Honey (1930; in which she introduced "Sing, You Sinners"), Cecil B. DeMille's Madam Satan (1930) with Reginald Denny and Kay Johnson, Sea Legs with Jack Oakie, and the Marx Brothers' second film, Animal Crackers (1930). She took over Ethel Merman's stage role in the film version of Take a Chance, singing "Eadie Was a Lady". After leaving Paramount, she was cast by Warner Bros. in a supporting role in the 1933 women's prison film Ladies They Talk About starring Barbara Stanwyck.

Roth headlined the Palace Theatre in New York City and performed in the Earl Carroll Vanities in 1928, 1931, and 1932. She continued to make strides as a singer in an era when so much was being set to music.

 During this time, her personal life increasingly was overshadowed by her alcoholism. Although her parents were not stereotypical stage parents, as a response to their influence, Roth came to rely too much on other people. In her books and interviews, she said she was too trusting of husbands who made key decisions concerning her money and contracts.

Roth was out of the limelight from the late 1930s. Roth's personal and spiritual feelings led her to convert to Catholicism in 1948. Friends accused her of forsaking Judaism; however, in her autobiography Roth explains that although her parents had believed in God, she and her sister had not been brought up religiously. Roth in her book also insists that she was so inherently Jewish that she could not really forget her heritage and thought that she was "the richer" because of it. In February 1953, she appeared on a special episode of the TV series This Is Your Life hosted by Ralph Edwards. In response to her honesty in relating her story of alcoholism, she received more than 40,000 letters. Her theme song, which she began singing as a child performer, was "When the Red, Red Robin (Comes Bob, Bob, Bobbin' Along)".

In 1962, she was featured as Elliott Gould's mother in the Broadway musical I Can Get It for You Wholesale, in which Barbra Streisand made her Broadway debut. Despite the acclaim for Streisand, producer David Merrick realized that Roth's name still sold tickets, and he elevated her to above-title star billing after the show's opening, with Gould, Streisand, and Sheree North listed below. Roth remained with the show for its full run of 301 performances and recorded the cast album for Columbia Records.

In 1965, she was featured as Rose Brice (mother of Fanny Brice) in the national touring company of Funny Girl (with Marilyn Michaels as Fanny), again getting top billing.

Marriages
Roth was married six times: to aviator William C. Scott ("Willie Richards"), Judge Benjamin Shalleck, Mark Harris, Eugene J. Weiner, Edward Goldman ("Vic"), and Thomas Burt McGuire. Before her marriages, she was engaged to David Lyons, who died of tuberculosis. She divorced her first husband in 1932 after 13 months of marriage.

In 1947, she met her last husband, Thomas Burt McGuire, scion of Funk and Wagnalls Publishing Company at an Alcoholics Anonymous meeting (Roth joined Alcoholics Anonymous in 1946). The two wed and McGuire managed Roth until September 1963, when she received a note from him stating that their marriage was finished.

Later years
In 1970 Roth lived in Palm Springs, California. She returned to Broadway in 1971 in the Kander and Ebb musical 70, Girls, 70, which despite its short run was also recorded by Columbia Records and has remained a popular cast album. She played a pathologist in the 1976 cult horror classic Alice, Sweet Alice (also known as Communion). Her last film was Boardwalk, with Lee Strasberg, Ruth Gordon, and Janet Leigh (1979). A successful concert at Town Hall was released as an album by AEI Records after her death. One of her latter appearances was in a well-reviewed club act at the legendary NYC nightclub, Reno Sweeney.

Autobiographies
Roth's autobiography, I'll Cry Tomorrow, was written with author-collaborator Gerold Frank in 1954, and a toned-down version of it was made into a hit film the following year starring Susan Hayward, who was nominated for an Academy Award. The book became a bestseller worldwide and sold more than 7 million copies in 20 languages, and the film renewed the public's interest in Roth. She recorded four songs for the Coral label (the first commercial recordings of her career), which were followed by an LP for Epic and another for Tops. She also headlined a vaudeville revival at the Palace on Broadway. A highlight of her act was an imitation of Susan Hayward imitating her (Roth) singing "Red, Red Robin".

In 1958, Roth published a second book, Beyond My Worth, which was not as successful as its predecessor, but told the compelling story of what it was like to be placed on a pedestal that she could not always live up to. Roth had managed to reinvent herself as a major concert and nightclub performer. She appeared at venues in Las Vegas and New York's Copacabana and was a popular attraction in Australia.

Death
After suffering a stroke at her New York City apartment in February 1980, Roth died at age 69 on May 12 at De Witt Nursing Home in Manhattan. Her obituary in The New York Times reports that she had "no immediate survivors". Roth's grave marker in Mount Pleasant Cemetery in Westchester County, New York, includes the inscription "As bad as it was it was good".

Filmography

Short Subjects:
 Pershing's Crusaders (1918) (uncredited extra)
 Lillian Roth and Band (1929)
 Lillian Roth and Her Piano Boys (1929)
 Lillian Roth and the Foster Girls (1929)
 Raising the Roof (1929)
 Naughty-Cal (1930)
 Meet the Boyfriend (1930)
 Down Among the Sugar Cane (1932)
 Ain't She Sweet (1933)
 Million Dollar Melody (1933)
 Story Conference (1934)
 Masks and Memories (1934)
 Arcade Varieties (1939)
 Snow Follies (1939)

Features:
 Illusion (1929)
 The Love Parade (1929)
 The Vagabond King (1930)
 Honey (1930)
 Paramount on Parade (1930)
 Madame Satan (1930)
 Animal Crackers (1930)
 Sea Legs (1930)
 Ladies They Talk About (1933)
 Take a Chance (1933)
 Alice, Sweet Alice (1976)
 Night-Flowers (1979)
 Boardwalk (1979)

References

Further reading
 Whatever Became of...?, Vol. III, 1970, The World Almanac 1966; published by New York World Telegram and The Sun.

External links

 
 
                                     Lillian Roth's appearance on The Mike Wallace Interview, April 5, 1958(Univ. of Texas/Austin: Harry Ranson Center)

1910 births
1980 deaths
20th-century American actresses
20th-century American singers
20th-century American women singers
Actresses from Boston
Actresses from Palm Springs, California
American film actresses
American musical theatre actresses
Articles containing video clips
Catholics from Massachusetts
Catholics from New York (state)
Converts to Roman Catholicism from Judaism
Jewish American actresses
Metro-Goldwyn-Mayer contract players
Paramount Pictures contract players
People from Manhattan
Vaudeville performers
20th-century American Jews